is a former Japanese football player.

In February 2015, Suzuki announced his retirement from football.

References

External links

1985 births
Living people
Waseda University alumni
Association football people from Chiba Prefecture
Japanese footballers
J1 League players
J2 League players
Kashima Antlers players
Shonan Bellmare players
Tochigi SC players
Giravanz Kitakyushu players
Association football midfielders